Henry Tift Myers Airport  is a public use airport located two nautical miles (4 km) southeast of the central business district of Tifton, a city in Tift County, Georgia, United States. It is owned by the Tifton & Tift County Airport Authority. This airport is included in the National Plan of Integrated Airport Systems for 2011–2015, which categorized it as a general aviation facility. It does not have scheduled commercial airline service.

History 
The airport was constructed in 1940.  In April, while under construction, the United States Army Air Corps indicated a need for the airfield as a training airfield.  The immediate construction involved runways and airplane hangars, with three concrete runways, several taxiways and a large parking apron and a control tower. Several large hangars were also constructed. Buildings were ultimately utilitarian and quickly assembled. Most base buildings, not meant for long-term use, were constructed of temporary or semi-permanent materials. Although some hangars had steel frames and the occasional brick or tile brick building could be seen, most support buildings sat on concrete foundations but were of frame construction clad in little more than plywood and tarpaper.

Tifton Army Airfield (also known as Turner AAF Auxiliary Field No. 9) was activated on August 12, 1940. It was used by the Army Air Forces Flying Training Command, Southeast Training Center (later Eastern Flying Training Command) for advanced two-engine flying training throughout World War II, until inactivated on December 28, 1944.  Aircraft flown at Tifton AAF were generally Curtiss AT-9s, and later TB-25 Mitchells.

Tifton AAF was placed on inactive status though the balance of the war, being turned over to the Army Corps of Engineers on September 21, 1946.  Title was returned to civil authorities in 1947.  The airport was renamed Henry Tift Myers Airport in honor of Tifton native Colonel Henry T. "Hank" Myers, who was the first pilot of Air Force One.

Facilities and aircraft 

Henry Tift Myers Airport covers an area of 826 acres (334 ha) at an elevation of 355 feet (108 m) above mean sea level. It has two asphalt paved runways: 15/33 is 5,504 by 100 feet (1,678 x 30 m) and 10/28 is 3,805 by 75 feet (1,160 x 23 m).

For the 12-month period ending August 24, 2010, the airport had 17,700 aircraft operations, an average of 48 per day: 99% general aviation and 1% military. At that time there were 39 aircraft based at this airport: 67% single-engine, 26% multi-engine, 5% jet, and 3% ultralight.

See also 

 Georgia World War II Army Airfields
 List of airports in Georgia (U.S. state)

References 

 
 Manning, Thomas A. (2005), History of Air Education and Training Command, 1942–2002.  Office of History and Research, Headquarters, AETC, Randolph AFB, Texas 
 Shaw, Frederick J. (2004), Locating Air Force Base Sites, History's Legacy, Air Force History and Museums Program, United States Air Force, Washington DC. 
 Shettle, M. L. (2005), Georgia's Army Airfields of World War II.

External links 
 TMA – Henry Tift Myers (Tifton) at Georgia DOT
 Walker Aviation, the fixed-base operator (FBO)
 Aerial image as of February 1999 from USGS The National Map
 

Airports in Georgia (U.S. state)
Buildings and structures in Tift County, Georgia
Transportation in Tift County, Georgia
Airfields of the United States Army Air Forces in Georgia (U.S. state)
1940 establishments in Georgia (U.S. state)
Airports established in 1940